The 2003–04 Alabama Crimson Tide men's basketball team (variously "Alabama", "UA", "Bama" or "The Tide") represented the University of Alabama in the 2003–04 college basketball season. The head coach was Mark Gottfried, who was in his sixth season at Alabama. The team played its home games at Coleman Coliseum in Tuscaloosa, Alabama and was a member of the Southeastern Conference. This was the 92nd season of basketball in the school's history. The Crimson Tide finished the season 20–13, 8–8 in SEC play, lost in the second round of the 2004 SEC men's basketball tournament. They were invited to the NCAA tournament and advance to the elite eight before losing to the eventual national champs, UCONN. This is to date the furthest any Alabama team has advanced in the tournament.

Roster

Schedule and results

|-
!colspan=12 style=|Exhibition

|-
!colspan=12 style=|Non-conference regular season

|-
!colspan=12 style=|SEC regular season

|-
!colspan=12 style=| SEC tournament

|-
!colspan=12 style="background:#990000; color:#FFFFFF;"|  NCAA tournament

See also
2004 NCAA Division I men's basketball tournament
2003–04 NCAA Division I men's basketball season
2003–04 NCAA Division I men's basketball rankings

References

Alabama
Alabama Crimson Tide men's basketball seasons
2003 in sports in Alabama
Alabama Crimson Tide
Alabama